The flag the Chuvash Autonomous Soviet Socialist Republic was adopted in 1954 by the government of the Chuvash Autonomous Soviet Socialist Republic. The flag is identical to the flag of the Russian Soviet Federative Socialist Republic.

History 
On February 25, 1926, the Presidium of the CEC of the Chuvash ASSR established a commission to develop the coat of arms and flag of the republic, announcing a contest for the best flag design.

First version 
On December 10, 1926, the commission decided to adopt the flag of Chuvash ASSR with the following description:

The flag drawing according to the approved description was made by the artist P. E. Martens. The flag was adopted officially by the resolution of the Presidium of the CEC of the Chuvash ASSR of January 3, 1927.

Second version 
On March 31, 1927, the 2nd All-Chuvash Congress of Soviets approved the new state flag of the Republic, by the Resolutions of the 2nd (7th) All-Chuvash Congress of Soviets:

Third version 
On February 12, 1931, by the Resolution of the All-Chuvash Congress of Soviets, the "On the State Emblem and Flag of the Chuvash ASSR" clarified the Chuvash language inscription of the motto "Proletarians, unite all countries!". The motto was placed on the flag along with the sickle and hammer and the abbreviation of the name of the republic (ЧАССР). The traditional ornament was also removed. The description of the new flag was contained in the decree:

Minor revision 
The flag underwent minor changes, which was confirmed on 19 May 1933. The motto changed from "Пӗтӗм тӗнђӗри пролеттарисем, пӗрлешӗр!" to "Пӗтӗм тӗнчӗри пролетарисем, пӗрлешӗр!"

In 1936, the flag was simplified, only the hammer and sickle, the name of the republic and the motto "Workers of all countries, unite".

Fourth version 
According to the Constitution of the Chuvash ASSR, which was adopted on July 18, 1937, the flag of the Chuvash ASSR became similar to the symbols of the RSFSR, but with the addition of the name of the Chuvash ASSR in Russian and Chuvash. The inscription on the flag was arranged with the abbreviation "АССР" was shared for both the Russian and Chuvash inscription.

The description of the flag was contained in the Article 112 of Chapter X of the Constitution of the Chuvash ASSR.

Note that in this version, the inscription "РСФСР" was written twice.

Revision 
The flag was revisde on 11 June 1940, with the removal of the same inscription "РСФСР". The "РСФСР" was now written only once.

Fifth version 
On May 6, 1954, the Decree of the Presidium of the Supreme Soviet of the RSFSR "On the State Flag of the Chuvash ASSR" was issued, and on June 16, 1954, the Supreme Council passed the Law of the Chuvash ASSR on the State Flag of the Chuvash ASSR. The law made an amendment to the article of the Constitution concerning the description of the flag. The flag of the Chuvash ASSR is identical to the flag of the Russian SFSR, but was supplemented with the inscription "Chuvash ASSR" in the Chuvash language.

On February 10, 1956, a new Regulation on the State Flag of the Chuvash ASSR was approved. The description of the flag in the text of the Regulations looked like this:

By the regulations, the flag itself was approved by the Resolution of the Council of Ministers of the Chuvash ASSR on 17 February 1956.

On January 5, 1967, the Decree of the PVS of the Chuvash ASSR "On Amendments to the Regulations on the National Flag of the Chuvash ASSR” was adopted. The appearance of the flag was not changed by the decree.

The extraordinary 8th session of the Supreme Council of the Chuvash ASSR of the 9th convocation on May 31, 1978, approved a new Constitution of the Chuvash ASSR. The flag of the Chuvash ASSR was reapproved through this constitution.

Sixth version 
On October 26, 1978, the new decree of the PVA of the Chuvash ASSR "On the State Flag of the Chuvash ASSR" approved the image of the flag. The inscription on the flag began to be separated in Russian and in Chuvash.

The decree of the PVA of the Chuvash ASSR of July 6, 1979 amended the Regulations on the state flag of the Chuvash ASSR, which was previously approved on 10 February 1956.

Gallery

References 

Chuvash Autonomous Soviet Socialist Republic
1927 establishments in the Soviet Union
1992 disestablishments in Russia